Berkman is a surname. Notable people with the surname include:

Alexander Berkman (1870–1936), Russian-American anarchist
Brenda Berkman (born 1951), First woman being hired by the New York City Fire Department
Lance Berkman (born 1976), American major league baseball player
Ted Berkman (1914–2006), American screenwriter

See also
 Berkman Center for Internet and Society, a department at Harvard Law School